The Man with My Face is a 1951 American film noir directed by Edward Montagne featuring Barry Nelson, Carole Mathews and Lynn Ainley. The film marks Jack Warden's movie debut.

Though the original novel is set in California, the movie takes place in Puerto Rico. It is the only film noir shot on location in that country.

Plot
The film is set in Puerto Rico, where Charles "Chick" Graham (Nelson) has settled down after the war to run a small business with his old army buddy (now his brother-in-law) Buster Cox (Harvey). Graham comes home one evening to find his wife, Cora (Ainley), acting as if he is an insane stranger.

A man who looks exactly like him, Albert "Bert" Rand (Nelson), has taken his place and is playing cards and drinking in his living room. Neither Cora nor Buster — not even Graham's dog — recognizes Graham; they think that he, rather than Rand, is the double.

Meanwhile, his face has shown up on the front page of newspapers as a bank robber in Miami who made off with half a million dollars. As Graham runs from the police, he attempts to solve the mystery with the help of Mary Davis (Mathews), an old girlfriend whom he jilted to marry Cora. Mary's protective brother, Walt Davis (Warden), is wary, but soon joins Graham in trying to figure out the puzzle.

Rand attempts to kill Graham by hiring an attack dog specialist to have a Doberman Pinscher go after him. The evil double has been in on this sinister plan with Cora and her brother, Buster, since before the Grahams' marriage.

Cast
 Barry Nelson as Charles "Chick" Graham / Albert "Bert" Rand
 Carole Mathews as Mary Davis
 Lynn Ainley as Cora Cox Graham
 John Harvey as Buster Cox
 Jim Boles as Meadows
 Jack Warden as Walt Davis
 Henry Lascoe as The Police Sergeant
 Johnny Kane as Al Grant 
 Chinita as Juanita
 Armando Miranda as Nightclub Bartender

Reception
Film critic Dennis Schwartz was lukewarm about the film, writing: "The B film has a good premise over mistaken identity, but a lousy execution. Montagne keeps it good enough as a diversionary time killer, but it's just too bad it never was convincing."

Remakes
It was remade in India in several regional languages, In 1988 it was made in Tamil as Dilli Baabu, in 1992 popular director David Dhawan made Bol Radha Bol and in 2017 in Telugu Goutham Nanda. All were blockbuster hits during their releases, while all were unofficial remakes.

References

External links
 
 
 
 'The Man with My Face film scene at Veoh

1951 films
1950s psychological thriller films
American psychological thriller films
American black-and-white films
Film noir
Films based on American novels
United Artists films
Films set in Puerto Rico
Films shot in Puerto Rico
Films directed by Edward Montagne
1950s English-language films
1950s American films